STAM can refer to:

 Ghent City Museum (in Dutch: Stadsmuseum Gent)
 Signal transducing adaptor molecule, a human gene
 Science and Technology of Advanced Materials, an open access journal in materials science
 Sparse totally anti-magic square, a type of Antimagic square
 UGM-89 Perseus, a cancelled U.S. Navy submarine-launched anti-ship and anti-submarine guided missile system known as Submarine TActical Missile
 Surface-to-air missile, otherwise spelt as Surface To Air Missile

Stam can refer to:
 Stam (surname)
 Chocolaterie Stam in the Netherlands and the Midwestern United States
 Ktav Stam, Jewish traditional writing
 Sofer stam, a scribe of Jewish religious books
 Stam (film),  a 2020 South African Afrikaans-language thriller film